Ceglie del Campo, sometimes simply Ceglie, is a quarter of Bari, the capital of Apulia, Italy. It is situated west of the city-centre.

Notes and references

Quarters of Bari
Former municipalities of Apulia